Ptyssoptera lativittella is a moth of the family Palaephatidae that is found in New South Wales, Australia.

References

Moths described in 1864
Palaephatidae